= LINC01590 =

Non-coding RNA in humans

Identifiers
- Aliases: LINC01590, dJ102H19.4, C6orf164, long intergenic non-protein coding RNA 1590
- External IDs: GeneCards: LINC01590
Orthologs
Databases	NCBI: entry
Species	Human	Mouse
Entrez	63914	n/a
Ensembl	n/a	n/a
UniProt	n a	n/a
RefSeq (mRNA)	NM_022084	n/a
RefSeq (protein)	n/a	n/a
Location (UCSC)	n/a	n/a
PubMed search		n/a
- Wikidata
View/Edit Human

Long intergenic non-protein coding RNA 1590 is a non-coding RNA that in humans is encoded by the LINC01590 gene.
